Concert Tonight is an American music television series which aired on the now-defunct DuMont Television Network.

Broadcast history
Concert Tonight first aired from December 30, 1953 to March 31, 1954, then was brought back from September 15, 1954 to April 6, 1955. During the 1954–55 season, Concert Tonight aired Wednesdays at 9 pm EST.

DuMont broadcast many music-based programs, including this one, which featured the Chicago Symphony performing an hour of music. The series was broadcast from DuMont affiliate WGN-TV in Chicago.

Episode status
One episode survives at the UCLA Film and Television Archive, while the November 18, 1953 episode survives as part of the Peabody Award collection. Edie Adams, an actress and singer who worked at DuMont before the network ceased broadcasting during 1956, claimed that so little value was given to DuMont's programs that in the late 1970s they were loaded onto three trucks and dumped into Upper New York Bay.

Several episodes from the 1950s of the Chicago Symphony being conducted by Fritz Reiner (as well as by George Szell) have survived and are available on DVD.

See also
List of programs broadcast by the DuMont Television Network
List of surviving DuMont Television Network broadcasts
1953-54 United States network television schedule
1954-55 United States network television schedule
This Is Music
The Music Show
Music From Chicago

References

Bibliography
David Weinstein, The Forgotten Network: DuMont and the Birth of American Television (Philadelphia: Temple University Press, 2004) 
Alex McNeil, Total Television, Fourth edition (New York: Penguin Books, 1980) 
Tim Brooks and Earle Marsh, The Complete Directory to Prime Time Network TV Shows, Third edition (New York: Ballantine Books, 1964)

External links
 
DuMont historical website 

1953 American television series debuts
1955 American television series endings
1950s American music television series
Classical music in the United States
DuMont Television Network original programming
Black-and-white American television shows
English-language television shows